Aleksander Jevšek (born July 21, 1961 in Slovenj Gradec) is a Slovenian policeman, lawyer, politician and veteran of the war for Slovenia.

Jevšek was the head of the criminal police in the Police Administration of Celje (1997-99), the director of the Police Administration of Murska Sobota (1999-2006), the director of the Police Administration of Ljubljana (2006) and on February 1, 2007, he became the director of the Criminal Police Administration of the General Police Administration of Slovenia. He retired in January 2011.

He is the president of the Association of Criminalists of Slovenia. In the 2011 National Assembly elections, he ran on the LDS ticket. In the 2014 local elections, as a member of the Social Democrats, he was elected to the position of mayor of Murska Sobota Municipality, and again in 2018.

On June 1, 2022, he became Minister of Development, Strategic Projects and Cohesion in the government of Robert Golob. With this, his mayoral mandate ended, and he was temporarily succeeded by deputy mayor Zoran Hoblaj.

References

1961 births
Living people
Social Democrats (Slovenia) politicians